Blacklisted is the third studio album by American musician Neko Case, released on August 20, 2002.

Blacklisted marked a departure from the alternative country sounds of Case's first two solo albums(?). Guest musicians on the album include Howe Gelb, Kelly Hogan, Mary Margaret O'Hara, Joey Burns, John Convertino, and Dallas Good.

As of 2009, sales in the United States have exceeded 113,000 copies, according to Nielsen SoundScan.

Critical reception 

Upon original release, Blacklisted was met with critical applause, with particular praise towards Case's vocals. AllMusic's Mark Deming wrote that it contained "some of her finest and most insightful performances to date", as well as noting her progressions as a lyricist and composer. Eric Carr for Pitchfork echoed this, dubbing her vocals "dense with emotional heft and more richly expressive" than her previous work in power pop collective The New Pornographers. Carr also applauded the backing musicians, calling their contributions "roundly excellent and evocative".

Blacklisted has continually earned praise in recent years, with critics applauding the results that came from Case's then-newfound artistic control. Spectrum Cultures Susan Darlington saw it show Case "at her sharpest and most fearless", writing that its songs' "confidence… [are] so great that it makes the listener wonder why it took her so long to take sole writing credits." Stereogums Rachel Brodsky saw it announce Case "forging her own country-noir sound", noting its "then-new" qualities such as "pioneering" genre fusion and more.

Online music magazine Pitchfork placed Blacklisted at number 141 on their list of top 200 albums of the 2000s.

Track listing 
All songs written by Case, except where noted.	

 "Things That Scare Me" (Case, Tom Ray) – 2:30
 "Deep Red Bells" – 4:03
 "Outro with Bees" – 1:35
 "Lady Pilot" – 2:26
 "Tightly" – 2:16
 "Look for Me (I'll Be Around)" (Sylvia Dee, Guy Wood) – 3:21
 "Stinging Velvet" – 2:55
 "Pretty Girls" – 3:25
 "I Missed the Point" – 1:52
 "Blacklisted" – 2:22
 "I Wish I Was the Moon" – 3:34
 "Runnin' Out of Fools" (Richard Ahlert, Kay Rogers) – 3:05
 "Ghost Wiring" – 3:54
 "Outro with Bees (Reprise)" - 2:24

Personnel 
Credits sourced from Blacklisteds liner notes.

 Neko Case - vocals , harmony vocals ; acoustic guitar, electric tenor guitar , tambourine , piano , acoustic tenor guitar , electric 6-string guitar & saw , electric guitar , drums & percussion ; arrangement 
 Kelly Hogan - sexy background vocals 
 Mary Margaret O'Hara - backing & harmony vocals 
 Dallas Good - 12-string guitar , baritone guitar , electric & acoustic guitar 
 Joey Burns - tenor guitar & pump organ , acoustic guitar , cello , bowed double bass , electric bass , electric guitar & acoustic guitar , vibraphone , accordion , upright bass 
 Brian Connelly - baritone guitar 
 Jon Rauhouse - banjo , pedal steel guitar , Hawaiian guitar 
 Howe Gelb - pump organ , piano , organ , Wurlitzer organ 
 Tom V. Ray - upright bass ; arrangement 
 John Convertino - drums

References 

2002 albums
Anti- (record label) albums
Neko Case albums
Bloodshot Records albums

External links